Thomas Kastenmaier (born 31 May 1966 in Munich) is a former German footballer and a current coach.

Mainly a right back who could also appear as a midfielder, he possessed a thunderous right-foot shot, often scoring from free kicks, and played most of his career for Borussia Mönchengladbach.

Football career
Having started his professional career with local FC Bayern Munich, Kastenmaier scored in his first division debut, a 4–0 home win over Hamburger SV, on 31 August 1989.

Deemed surplus to requirements after having appeared in only nine games for the 1990 champions, Kastenmaier joined Borussia Mönchengladbach, scoring nine goals in two separate seasons, while also helping the club to the 1995 German Cup.

He retired in 1998 after two injury-ravaged seasons, subsequently beginning his managerial career, starting with Borussia's amateurs.

Honours
Bayern Munich
Bundesliga: 1989–90

Borussia Mönchengladbach
DFB-Pokal: 1994–95

References

External links
 

1966 births
Living people
German footballers
Association football defenders
Bundesliga players
FC Bayern Munich II players
FC Bayern Munich footballers
Borussia Mönchengladbach players
German football managers
Footballers from Munich
West German footballers